After Bathing at Baxter's is the third studio album by the San Francisco psychedelic rock band Jefferson Airplane, released in 1967 as RCA Victor LSO-1511 (stereo) and LOP-1511 (mono). The cover art is by artist Ron Cobb.

Due to the lack of a breakout hit, the experimental album was significantly less successful than its predecessor from a commercial standpoint, peaking at number 17 on the Billboard album chart and failing to attain a RIAA certification. Paul Kantner's composition "The Ballad of You and Me and Pooneil" was released as a single in August 1967, with him as lead singer and Grace Slick and Marty Balin harmonizing, and reached number 42 on the Billboard charts. The band's singles never again crossed the halfway mark in the Hot 100. It was voted number 595 in Colin Larkin's All Time Top 1000 Albums 3rd Edition (2000).

John Hartford referenced the cover art from After Bathing at Baxter's as the inspiration for his song "Steam Powered Aereo Plane" from his album Aereo-Plain.

Cash Box said that the single "Watch Her Ride" had a "hard rock beat with a backup centering on electrified workouts from lead guitar," "grand imagery" and "fine vocals."

Title
According to Jeff Tamarkin's history of the Airplane, "baxter" was the band's code for the psychedelic drug LSD or "acid", and the title as a whole translates to "After Tripping On Acid".

Track listing
Side one

Side two

Notes

Personnel
Jefferson Airplane
Grace Slick – piano, organ, recorder, vocals, lead vocals on "rejoyce" and "Two Heads"
Marty Balin – rhythm guitar, vocals, lead vocals on "Young Girl Sunday Blues"
Paul Kantner – rhythm guitar, vocals, lead vocals on "The Ballad of You & Me & Pooneil", "Martha", "Wild Tyme", "Watch Her Ride" and Won't You Try / Saturday Afternoon"
Jorma Kaukonen – lead guitar, sitar, vocals, lead vocals on "The Last Wall of the Castle"
Jack Casady – bass
Spencer Dryden – drums, percussion, horn arrangement
Additional personnel
Gary Blackman – vocals
Bill Thompson – vocals

Production
Jefferson Airplane – design, notes, song arrangement
Al Schmitt – producer
Richie Schmitt – engineer
Ron Cobb – album cover, artwork
The Walking Owls – album title
Alan Pappé – photography
Recorded at RCA, Hollywood

Chart positions
Album

Single

References

1967 albums
Albums arranged by Spencer Dryden
Albums produced by Al Schmitt
Jefferson Airplane albums
RCA Victor albums